Lieutenant General Pattiarimal Mohamadali Hariz, PVSM, AVSM, SM, VSM, ADC is the former General Officer-Commanding-in-Chief (GOC-in-C) Southern Command of the Indian Army and served in office from 1 September 2016 to 30 November 2017. He assumed the post from General Bipin Rawat and was succeeded by Dewan Rabindranath Soni.

Early life and education 
Hariz was born in Kozhikode, Kerala, India and is the son of Pattiarimmal and Fathima Mohamadali. He is an alumnus of Sainik School, Amaravathinagar and National Defence Academy, Pune. He also attended the staff course at Staff College Camberly; higher command course at Army War College, Mhow and National Defence College, New Delhi.

Career 
Hariz was commissioned into the 16th battalion, Mahar Regiment, a mechanized infantry battalion, on June 10, 1978. He has vast experience and has served in numerous positions. He has commanded the 9th battalion, Mechanised Infantry Regiment, a brigade with an amphibious role, a RAPID division in a Strike Corps and X Corps (Bhatinda). He has also held numerous staff appointments including Brigade Major of an armoured brigade, Assistant Military Secretary at the Military Secretary's branch, a Staff Officer in Weapons and Equipment Directorate at IHQ, New Delhi; instructor at Infantry School, Mhow; instructor at Defence Services Staff College, Wellington; Additional Directorate General of Mechanised Forces and GOC-in-C of the Army Training Command. He held various appointments including Military observer, Chief Personal Office and Regional Commander at the UN Mission in Angola.

During his career he has been awarded the Vishisht Seva Medal in 2007, Sena Medal in 2009, Ati Vishisht Seva Medal and Param Vishisht Seva Medal in 2016 for his service.

Honours and decorations

Personal life 
He is married to Zarina Hariz and they have a son who is also an officer in the Mechanised Infantry Regiment and a daughter who is a teacher. His brother, Arif Mohamadali, is a retired commander of the Indian Navy.

References 

Living people
Indian generals
Recipients of the Param Vishisht Seva Medal
Recipients of the Ati Vishisht Seva Medal
Indian Army personnel
Recipients of the Vishisht Seva Medal
Recipients of the Sena Medal
 Sena Medal
Year of birth missing (living people)
National Defence College, India alumni
Army War College, Mhow alumni
Academic staff of the Defence Services Staff College
Graduates of the Staff College, Camberley